Allan Gerard MacMaster (born September 26, 1974) is a Canadian politician. He represents the electoral district of Inverness in the Nova Scotia House of Assembly as a member of the Progressive Conservative Party.

Early life and career

He is the son of Marie and Buddy MacMaster, and grew up in the community of Judique in Inverness County. He graduated from St. Francis Xavier University with a degree in business administration.

Prior to being elected, MacMaster worked as an investment advisor with BMO Nesbitt Burns, and authored a monthly column for the Nova Scotia Business Journal entitled "Building Your Wealth". He also worked as an assistant to the former MLA for Inverness.

Political career
MacMaster was first elected to the Nova Scotia House of Assembly in a by-election on October 20, 2009. He served as Chair of the Public Accounts Committee from 2009 to 2018, acting as Chair of the committee from 2013 to 2018.

In March 2010, MacMaster issued a rare Gaelic resolution in the Nova Scotia House of Assembly, asking for continued government support for Gaelic language, history and culture in Nova Scotia. It was passed unanimously by all members.

In his first full session in the legislature, MacMaster introduced two bills: An Act to Provide Greater Flexibility for Nova Scotians' Retirement Savings in Locked-in Accounts and An Act to Amend Chapter 31 of the Acts of 1996, the Sales Tax Act which would prohibit the province from proposing or agreeing to an increase in the provincial portion of the federally enacted harmonized sales tax.

In 2012, he brought the idea forward to extend pension wind up for Newpage pension plans during debate on Bill 96 Pension Benefits Act in 2011, but this was voted down. A new bill was created for the same purpose and passed.

Since 2013, he has been an advocate for patient safety and the access to a CT scanner at the Inverness hospital, and a voice for those opposing the "Royal" designation of the Gaelic College in Cape Breton.

In October 2014, MacMaster delivered a speech in the legislature about the struggles faced by victims of sexual abuse.

MacMaster was re-elected in the 2013 election, the 2017 election and again in the 2021 election. He was appointed Deputy Premier, Minister of Finance and Treasury Board, Gaelic Affairs and Labour Relations on August 31, 2021.

Electoral record

|Progressive Conservative
|Allan MacMaster
|align="right"|4,687
|align="right"|61.90
|align="right"|

|New Democratic Party
|Michelle A. Smith
|align="right"|538
|align="right"|7.10
|align="right"|
|}

|Progressive Conservative
|Allan MacMaster
|align="right"|3,816
|align="right"|49.29
|align="right"|

|New Democratic Party
|Michelle A. Smith
|align="right"|678
|align="right"|8.76
|align="right"|
|}

|Progressive Conservative
|Allan MacMaster
|align="right"|3,155
|align="right"|35.75
|align="right"|-20.30

|New Democratic Party
|Bert Lewis
|align="right"|2,342
|align="right"|26.54
|align="right"|+5.66

|}

References

External links
 Members of the Nova Scotia Legislative Assembly
 PC Party profile

Living people
Progressive Conservative Association of Nova Scotia MLAs
Finance ministers of Nova Scotia
Members of the Executive Council of Nova Scotia
People from Inverness County, Nova Scotia
1974 births
St. Francis Xavier University alumni
21st-century Canadian politicians
Bank of Montreal people